Shomi Patwary (born February 20, 1982, in Dhaka, Bangladesh) is a filmmaker, and co-founder of the creative collective Illusive Media. Shomi currently runs a production company with his wife Punom Patwary based out of New York City.

Illusive Media 
While a student at Old Dominion University Patwary co-created the multimedia artists collective, Illusive Media, with his lifelong friend and classmate Philip Ly. Initially the group began creating a web presence for underground artists, but later helped national acts like Sean Paul and N*E*R*D create an image that connected with a broader fan base. As websites like MySpace began to lose its grip in the internet and bloggers became the dominant source of information, Shomi and Illusive Media began directing Music Videos giving bloggers exclusive content to certain artists.  Through Illusive Media, Shomi has directed music videos for several artists, most notably A$AP Mob & Clipse. Shomi Patwary with Illusive Media has directed videos for: Lupe Fiasco, Major Lazer, ASAP Rocky, Mark Ronson, Joey Badass as well as many others.

Shomi is known for his guerrilla style of directing and editing often shooting, editing and releasing a complete project on the fly over a few days time. Through Illusive Media, Patwary is also widely respected for often taking into account a musician's image and artistic input and putting his own spin on the project creating a truly collaborative process. He is often credited alongside other Illusive Media artistic collaborators such as Phil Ly (co-director), Abe Vilchez-Moran (Director), Robert Elliot Simmons (Special Effects), Tashfiq Patwary (Producer), Charley Feher (Videographer Designer), Paolo Obcemane (Videographer/Photographer/Video Editor) and Jay McCord (Producer/Director/Actor). Shomi's younger brother, Tashfiq, is a member of the VERYRVRE production team which has produced tracks for the hip hop collective A$AP Mob and Santigold.

Haiti earthquake 
After the 2010 Haiti earthquake Shomi teamed up with Robert Simmons, Jay McCord, Kenna, Lupe Fiasco, and Mike Shinoda on the "Resurrection" music video to promote the "Music For Relief". The song was written and the music video was directed for free with all proceeds going to aid the Haiti disaster through Music for Relief.

KarmaloopTV & the FADER 
In April 2012, Shomi was brought on board as an in-house music video director and television producer by Karmaloop.com's TV division. Shomi has worked with KarmaloopTV to help build the television and music video brand and tie it in with the online retail giant's streetwear image.  KarmaloopTV created a new division known as Karmaloop Media during the summer of 2012 Since taking the helm at Karmaloop, Patwary has shot videos for Beyoncé, ASAP Rocky, Diplo, Stalley, Wale, No Malice of the Clipse, and A-Trak. In 2014, Shomi left his appointment with Karmaloop to join the editorial team at the FADER magazine. With the FADER he will oversee all video production as Senior Video Producer.

2016 Much Music Award nominations 
Shomi Patwary was nominated in several categories in 2016's Much Music Awards for Belly's video  "Might Not" featuring The Weeknd.

Video of the Year
 Alessia Cara, "Here," Directed by Aaron A.
 Belly f. The Weeknd, "Might Not," Directed by Belly and Shomi Patwary
 Drake, "Hotline Bling," Directed by Director X
 Grimes, "Flesh Without Blood," Directed by Claire Boucher
 Shawn Mendes and Camila Cabello, "I Know What You Did Last Summer," Directed by Ryan Pallotta

Best Hip Hop Video
 Belly f. The Weeknd, "Might Not," Directed by Belly and Shomi Patwary
 Drake, "Hotline Bling," Directed by Director X
 Jazz Cartier, "The Valley/Dead or Alive," Directed by Kyle Sanderson
 John River, "Get Down," Directed by Abstrakte
 SonReal, "Whoa Nilly," Directed by Peter Huang

Best MuchFact Video
 Belly f. The Weeknd, "Might Not," Directed by Belly and Shomi Patwary
 Humans, "Water Water," Directed by Peter Ricq
 Majid Jordan f. Drake, "My Love," Directed by Common Good
 SonReal, "Whoa Nilly," Directed by Peter Huang
 Young Empires, "The Gates," Directed by Amos LeBlanc

Videography

2007
 Skillz feat Freeway - "Don't Act Like You Don't Know"

2009
 Clipse  - "Doorman"
 Clipse, Kanye West, KAWS - "Kinda Like A Big Deal" (Webisode)

2010
 Nottz - "Shine So Brite"
 Clipse - "Freedom"
 Kenna feat Lupe Fiasco, Mike Shinoda of Linkin Park - "Resurrection"
 Lupe Fiasco - "I'm Beamin" 
 David Banner And 9th Wonder feat Heather Victoria - "Slow Down"
 Mansions on the Moon - "She Makes Me Feel"

2011
 Pusha T - "Cook It Down"
 Stalley - "Chevys and Spaceships"

2012
 Diplo feat Nicky Da B - "Express Yourself" (Director of Photography)
 Stalley feat Wale - "Home To You" 
 A$AP Ferg - "Work" 
 ASAP Rocky, ASAP Ant, Flatbush Zombies - "Bath Salt"

2013
A-Trak feat Jim Jones, Juicy J, Flatbush Zombies, El-P - "Piss Test (Remix)"
A$AP Ferg - Hood Pope
Beyoncé - No Angel (Director of Photography)

2014
A$AP Rocky - Multiply
Major Lazer feat RDX - Lose Yourself (Director of Photography / Co-director)
Major Lazer, Skrillex, Ezra Koenig (Vampire Weekend) - In Jamaica (Documentary)
Mary J. Blige - Earlier That Day (The FADER Documentary)
Vince Staples - Earlier That Day (The FADER Documentary)
Trey Songz - Earlier That Day (The FADER Documentary)
Jeremih - Jeremih Rides His Old Bus Route in Chicago (The FADER Documentary)
Yung Lean - Goes Shopping In Brooklyn (The FADER Documentary)

2015
A$AP Rocky - Jukebox 
Ty Dolla Sign feat. Charli XCX, Tinashe - Drop That Kitty 
Mark Ronson feat. Keyone Starr - I Can't Lose 
Keith Ape feat. Waka Flocka, Father, A$AP Ferg - IT G MA (Remix) 
Goldlink - Sober Thoughts 
Belly ft. The Weeknd - Might Not

2016
Pusha T - ft. A$AP Rocky, The-Dream - M.P.A.
A$AP Ferg ft. Future - New Level 
A$AP Mob - Yamborghini High
A$AP Ferg ft. Big Sean - World Is Mine
Joey Badass - Devastated 
Kaytranada ft Syd - You're The One 
Kevin Hart aka Chocolate Droppa ft Trey Songz - Push It On Me 
Goldlink - Fall In Love

2017

A$AP Ferg ft. Remy Ma - East Coast 
A$AP Ferg ft. A$AP Rocky, Rick Ross, Busta Rhymes, Dave East - East Coast (Remix) 
Mountain Dew x NBA ft. Joey Badass - Victory (Courtside Project) 
Shah Rukh Khan x Diplo - Phurrr
Jaden Smith - Watch Me 
Desiigner ft. Gucci Mane - Liife 
Tyga ft. Ty Dolla $ign - Move To LA 
24HRS ft. Wiz Khalifa, Ty Dolla $ign - What You Like 
Vic Mensa ft. Pharrell, Pusha T - OMG

2018
Wu-Tang Clan - For The Children: 25 Years of Enter The Wu-Tang (36 Chambers) 
Offset & Metro Boomin ft. Ric Flair - Ric Flair Drip 
Diplo ft. Desiigner - Suicidal 
Diljit Dosanjh - Big Scene 
Belly ft. NAV - Maintain
Ava Max - Sweet But Psycho
Abir - Young & Rude
Maxo Kream - Roaches
Gashi ft DJ Snake, French Montana - Creep On Me
Nghtmre ft. A$AP Ferg - Redline

2019

NY Knicks - We Are New York (Commercial)
Sony - 360 Audio (Commercial)
Adidas, Highsnobiety - Night Shift (Commercial)
Gentle Monster - 13 (Commercial)
Seeb, Olivia O'Brien, Space Primates - Fade Out
Madeon - All My Friends (Producer)
Mariah Carey - All I Want For Christmas Is You (Photoshoot)
A$AP Ferg ft. A$AP Rocky - PUPS
Maxo Kream - Meet Again
Abir - Reunion

2020

Lil Tjay - Losses
RMR - I'm Not Over You (Desus & Mero)
Comethazine - No Front
Boogie ft. Joey Bada$$ - Outside

2021

Calboy ft. Lil Wayne - Miseducation
Shy Glizzy ft. RMR - White Lies
Rich The Kid - Richard Millie Patek
Curated by Rico Nasty | New Classic Crocs Sandal (Commercial)
DJ Clark Kent Shares His Biggest eBay Sneaker Shopping Tips (Commercial)
Greetings From Orchard Beach With J Balvin (Desus & Mero)
For the Culture: Bodega Boys Tour the Metropolitan Museum of Art (Desus & Mero)
Yo-Yo Ma & the Bodega Boys Collab on Cellos, DMX & More (Desus & Mero)
Good Wholesome Fun ft. Lil Nas X (Desus & Mero)
Barry Jenkins on Trauma in Media & Auditioning for Moonlight 2 (Desus & Mero)
Lil Dicky & GaTa Put IRL Friendship on FXX's "Dave" (Desus & Mero)
 A$AP Rocky on Swedish Jail, New Music, & Rihanna (Desus & Mero)
 F1 Legend Lewis Hamilton Races D&M, Talks Met Gala (Desus & Mero)
Snapple Presents A Corner Story (Branded Content, Documentary)
Facebook Gaming #PLAYLOUD (Branded Content, Documentary)

2022

UPS x Might Dream ft. Pharrell Williams (Branded Content)
Square - Square Kitchen ft. Daron The Chef (Branded Content)
Google x Tech Equity Collective - Something In The Water Campaign (Branded Content, Motion Graphics)
Wu-Tang 'Forever' Album 25th Anniversary Documentary (Branded Content)
Lit Day Drinking & Dallas BBQ ft. Seth Meyers (Desus & Mero)
Abbott Elementary's Janelle James Helps Kids Keep It Real (Desus & Mero)
How to Thrift w/ HBO's John Wilson (Desus & Mero)
Armani White - Billie Eilish (Executive Producer)
Skilliebeng ft. French Montana, Fivio Foreign - Whap Whap Remix (Director)
Freddie Dredd - Want (Executive Producer)

References 

Old Dominion University alumni
1982 births
People from Dhaka
Living people
American people of Bangladeshi descent